Petter Sevel (born 9 December 1974) is a retired Norwegian football midfielder.

His family moved from Loddefjord to Horsøy in the mid-1980s. As a teenager he was a part of the Norwegian junior national team in boxing. He played for Kleppestø before being discovered by Haugesund ahead of the 1999 season. He helped win promotion and played in the 2000 Eliteserien, but was not a regular and went on to Stord.

In 2007 he made a comeback in Kleppestø, which had now been merged to form the club Askøy, before playing for smaller local club Vestsiden Askøy.

References

1974 births
Living people
People from Askøy
Norwegian footballers
FK Haugesund players
Stord IL players
Association football midfielders
Norwegian First Division players
Eliteserien players
Sportspeople from Vestland